The following television stations operate on virtual channel 14 in the United States:

 K05JU-D in Elko, Nevada
 K06QS-D in Salina & Redmond, Utah
 K12QQ-D in Cedar City, Utah
 K12QS-D in Mink Creek, Idaho
 K12XE-D in Woodland, Utah
 K13NZ-D in Shoshoni, Wyoming
 K13AAO-D in Helper, Utah
 K14JS-D in Cortez, etc., Colorado
 K14LP-D in Cottage Grove, Oregon
 K14NR-D in Tyler, Texas
 K14PX-D in Paxico, Kansas
 K14QG-D in Alamogordo, New Mexico
 K14RB-D in St. Paul, Minnesota
 K14SH-D in Marshfield, Missouri
 K14TK-D in Santa Maria, California
 K15LE-D in Heber City, Utah
 K16AE-D in Gillette, Wyoming
 K17DM-D in Myton, Utah
 K18DL-D in Logan, Utah
 K18JA-D in Pinedale, Wyoming
 K18KG-D in Spencer, Iowa
 K19DU-D in Summit County, Utah
 K19EW-D in Preston, Idaho
 K19FZ-D in Elko, Nevada
 K19LR-D in Huntsville, etc., Utah
 K20MT-D in Mount Pleasant, Utah
 K20NA-D in Hatch, Utah
 K20NB-D in Circleville, Utah
 K20NV-D in Fruitland, Utah
 K21EZ-D in Price, Utah
 K21HH-D in Preston, Idaho
 K21IU-D in Navajo Mtn. Sch., etc., Utah
 K21IV-D in Oljeto, Utah
 K21IW-D in Mexican Hat, Utah
 K21MY-D in Richfield, etc., Utah
 K21MZ-D in Koosharem, Utah
 K21NA-D in Bicknell & Teasdale, Utah
 K21NB-D in Rural Sevier County, Utah
 K21NC-D in Henrieville, Utah
 K21ND-D in Mayfield, Utah
 K21NE-D in Panguitch, Utah
 K22GW-D in Wells, Nevada
 K22JG-D in Green River, Utah
 K22MM-D in Garfield County, Utah
 K22NF-D in Orangeville, Utah
 K22NO-D in Tulia, Texas
 K23DV-D in Beryl/Modena/New, Utah
 K23PU-D in Norfolk, Nebraska
 K24MZ-D in Fillmore, etc., Utah
 K24NC-D in Roosevelt, Utah
 K24NF-D in Tucumcari, New Mexico
 K25CK-D in Montpelier, Idaho
 K25CQ-D in Childress, Texas
 K25GS-D in Manti and Ephraim, Utah
 K25IP-D in Malad City, Idaho
 K25OZ-D in East Price, Utah
 K26EA-D in Milford, etc., Utah
 K26NW-D in Marysvale, Utah
 K27IS-D in Emery, Utah
 K27KC-D in Ferron, Utah
 K27KE-D in Huntington, Utah
 K27NO-D in Vernal, Utah
 K27OG-D in Clarendon, Texas
 K28KM-D in Clareton, Wyoming
 K28KV-D in Turkey, Texas
 K28PK-D in Scofield, Utah
 K28PV-D in Clovis, New Mexico
 K29II-D in Park City, Utah
 K29MS-D in Green River, Utah
 K29MW-D in Duchesne, Utah
 K29MX-D in Manila, etc, Utah
 K30FY-D in Guymon, Oklahoma
 K30GA-D in Garfield County, Utah
 K30GV-D in Shoshoni, Wyoming
 K30KC-D in Samak, Utah
 K30PQ-D in Clear Creek, Utah
 K31JE-D in Escalante, Texas
 K31KC-D in Coalville & adjacent area, Utah
 K31LH-D in Fishlake Resort, Utah
 K31NX-D in Fountain Green, Utah
 K31OG-D in Parowan, Enoch, etc., Utah
 K31PJ-D in Holbrook, Idaho
 K32JI-D in Emery, Utah
 K32JN-D in Big Piney, etc., Wyoming
 K32LX-D in Soda Springs, Idaho
 K32MX-D in Randolph & Woodruff, Utah
 K33EB-D in Cedar Canyon, Utah
 K33HX-D in Tropic & Cannonville, Utah
 K33JO-D in Bluff & area, Utah
 K34FO-D in Alton, Utah
 K34NA-D in Tampico, Montana
 K34OQ-D in Beaver etc., Utah
 K34OV-D in Washington, etc., Utah
 K35NC-D in Hanksville, Utah
 K35NL-D in Boulder, Utah
 K35NM-D in Caineville, Utah
 K35NP-D in Kanarraville, New Harmony, Utah
 K36CA-D in Memphis, Texas
 K36IK-D in Delta/Oak City, etc., Utah
 K36JW-D in Spring Glen, Utah
 K36OH-D in Fremont, Utah
 K36OW-D in Henefer & Echo, Utah
 K41LL-D in Nephi, Utah
 K42DZ-D in Battle Mountain, Nevada
 K42IW-D in Long Valley Junction, Utah
 K44JU-D in Antimony, Utah
 K45GM-D in Blanding/Monticello, Utah
 K50GA-D in Laketown, etc., Utah
 KAOM-LD in Sweetwater, Texas
 KARD in West Monroe, Louisiana
 KBVO in Llano, Texas
 KBVO-CD in Austin, Texas
 KCEC in Boulder, Colorado
 KCIT in Amarillo, Texas
 KCSG in Cedar City, Utah
 KDTV-DT in San Francisco, California
 KEKE in Hilo, Hawaii
 KETH-TV in Houston, Texas
 KFAM-CD in Lake Charles, Louisiana
 KFJX in Pittsburg, Kansas
 KFOX-TV in El Paso, Texas
 KGWC-TV in Casper, Wyoming
 KIBN-LD in Lufkin, Texas
 KINV-LD in Billings, Montana
 KJDA-LD in Sherman, Texas
 KJZZ-TV in Salt Lake City, Utah
 KLUZ-TV in Albuquerque, New Mexico
 KMCY in Minot, North Dakota
 KMEG in Sioux City, Iowa
 KMYL-LD in Lubbock, Texas
 KNRC-LD in Sparks, Nevada
 KPBI-CD in Bentonville, Arkansas
 KPBN-LD in Baton Rouge, Louisiana
 KPHS-LD in Lovelock, Nevada
 KPOM-CD in Ontario, California
 KQPS-LD in Hot Springs, Arkansas
 KSVT-LD in Twin Falls, Idaho
 KTBO-TV in Oklahoma City, Oklahoma
 KTGM in Tamuning, Guam
 KUDF-LP in Tucson, Arizona
 KVIQ-LD in Eureka, California
 KWHE in Honolulu, Hawaii
 KXAP-LD in Tulsa, Oklahoma
 KXBF-LD in Bakersfield, California
 W14CX-D in Knoxville, Tennessee
 W14DA-D in Harpswell, Maine
 W14DK-D in Dagsboro, Delaware
 W14EE-D in Algood, Tennessee
 W26EV-D in Portsmouth, Virginia
 W33DH-D in Eau Claire, Wisconsin
 WABW-TV in Pelham, Georgia
 WCMU-TV in Mount Pleasant, Michigan
 WCWF in Suring, Wisconsin
 WDMR-LD in Springfield, Massachusetts
 WDYB-CD in Daytona Beach, Florida
 WEBA-TV in Allendale, South Carolina
 WECX-LD in Eau Claire, Wisconsin
 WFDC-DT in Arlington, Virginia
 WFIE in Evansville, Indiana
 WHKY-TV in Hickory, North Carolina
 WIIW-LD in Nashville, Tennessee
 WMAW-TV in Meridian, Mississippi
 WOBC-CD in Battle Creek, Michigan
 WOST in Mayaguez, Puerto Rico
 WPDS-LD in Largo, etc., Florida
 WPTO in Oxford, Ohio
 WPXA-TV in Rome, Georgia
 WQQZ-CD in Ponce, Puerto Rico
 WSCG-LD in Beaufort, etc., South Carolina
 WSEC in Jacksonville, Illinois
 WTBZ-LD in Gainesville, Florida
 WXIV-LD in Myrtle Beach, South Carolina
 WXSL-LD in St. Elmo, Illinois
 WYBN-LD in Cobleskill, New York
 WYDO in Greenville, North Carolina

The following stations, which are no longer licensed, formerly operated on virtual channel 14:
 K17LB-D in Perryton, Texas
 K22EC-D in Juab, Utah
 K27BZ-D in Wellington, Texas
 K31CD-D in Canadian, Texas
 K40DD-D in Gruver, Texas
 K43NU-D in Follett, Texas
 K45DY-D in New Mobeetie, Texas
 K50DY-D in Capulin, etc., New Mexico
 KBBA-LD in Cedar Falls, Iowa
 KOIB-LD in Columbia, Missouri
 KRHP-LD in The Dalles, Oregon
 KZDE-LD in Fort Collins, Colorado
 W14DJ-D in Myrtle Beach, South Carolina
 WAZH-CD in Harrisonburg, Virginia
 WDLF-LD in Peoria, Illinois
 WMEI in Arecibo, Puerto Rico
 WNWE-LD in Lincoln, Nebraska
 WPDZ-LD in Buxton, North Carolina
 WTSD-CD in Philadelphia, Pennsylvania

References

14 virtual